The 2000–01 Kansas Jayhawks men's basketball team represented the University of Kansas in the 2000–01 NCAA Division I men's basketball season, which was the Jayhawks' 103rd basketball season. The head coach was Roy Williams, who served his 13th year at KU. The team played its home games in Allen Fieldhouse in Lawrence, Kansas. The Jayhawks were eliminated in the Sweet 16 of the NCAA tournament by Illinois, who were coached by future Kansas head coach Bill Self.

Roster

Schedule

|-
!colspan=9| Exhibition

|-
!colspan=9| Coaches Vs. Cancer Classic

|-
!colspan=9| Regular season

|-
!colspan=9| Big 12 tournament

|-
!colspan=9| NCAA tournament

Rankings

See also
 2001 NCAA Division I men's basketball tournament
 2001 Big 12 men's basketball tournament
 2000-01 NCAA Division I men's basketball season
 2000–01 NCAA Division I men's basketball rankings

References 

Kansas Jayhawks men's basketball seasons
Kansas
Kansas
Jay
Jay